Gordeyevsky (masculine), Gordeyevskaya (feminine), or Gordeyevskoye (neuter) is the name of several rural localities in Russia:
Gordeyevsky, Altai Krai, a settlement in Gordeyevsky Selsoviet of Troitsky District of Altai Krai
Gordeyevsky, Volgograd Oblast, a khutor in Semenovsky Selsoviet of Kikvidzensky District of Volgograd Oblast